The Jaguara Dam is an embankment dam on the Grande River about  north of Rifaina, Brazil. The dam is on the border of Conquista municipality in the state of Minas Gerais to the north and Rifaina municipality in the state of São Paulo to the south. It was constructed between 1966 and 1971 for the purpose of hydroelectric power generation.

See also

List of power stations in Brazil

External links

References

Dams completed in 1971
Energy infrastructure completed in 1971
Dams in Minas Gerais
Dams on the Rio Grande (Paraná River tributary)
Hydroelectric power stations in Brazil
Dams in São Paulo (state)